The Suck Up Project: Mr. XXX-Kisser (also known as King of Abu) (Korean: 아부의 왕; RR: Ahbuwei Wang) is a 2012 South Korean comedy directed by Jung Seung-gu and starring Song Sae-byeok and Sung Dong-il. The film is a satire on Korean corporate culture.

Plot 
Dong-sik (Song) is an employee at a large insurance company. He works hard and does everything by the book, in contrast to his colleagues, who are more interested in schmoozing their way into promotions. Dong-sik’s naïve sense of ethics gets him into trouble in both his professional and private life. When he gets demoted to insurance salesman, Dong-sik struggles due to his tactlessness and lack of charm. He then discovers that his mother borrowed money from a loan shark to pay for his father’s promotion to Principal at a local school. In order to improve his sales and pay back the loan sharks, Dong-sik seeks help from legendary silver-tongued master Hyeo Go-soo (Sung), whose book about wooing and persuading others is deeply prized among his colleagues. Go-soo takes Dong-sik on as an apprentice, with Dong-sik desperately following his teachings in order to improve his sales.

Cast 

 Song Sae-byeok as Dong-sik
 Sung Dong-il as Go-soo
 Kim Sung-ryung as Ye-ji
 Ko Chang-seok as Seong-cheol
 Kim Min-jae as Seong-cheol’s second 
 Lee Byung-joon as President Lee
 Cha Seung-won as himself 
 Park Bo-kyung as Middle aged woman
 Lee Cheol-min as Director Son

Release & Reception 
The film was released on March 2, 2012, and grossed $3 million at the South Korean box office. It received generally positive reviews and was described by The Korea Times and The Chosun Ilbo as the strongest South Korean comedy of the year.

References

External links
 
 
King of Abu (Mr. Xxx-Kisser) at Movist

2012 films
South Korean comedy films
2010s Korean-language films
2012 comedy films
2010s South Korean films